Hema (born Krishna Veni) is an Indian actress and comedian who predominantly appears in Telugu films. She has acted in more than 250 films as of 2014. She won Nandi Award for Best Female Comedian for her performance in Konchem Ishtam Konchem Kashtam.

Early life
She was born as Krishna Veni in a family from Razole, East Godavari district. She studied until seventh class, then discontinued her studies. She had an interest in films from her childhood. After acting in some, she got married. She made her comeback to film with Murari, and is now continuing her film career. She changed her name to Hema after coming to the film industry.

Filmography

Telugu
Telugu films

 Chinnari Sneham (1989)
 Koduku Diddina Kapuram (1989)
 Swathi Chinukulu (1989)
 Muddula Mavayya (1989)
 Bala Gopaludu (1989)
 Palnati Rudraiah (1989)
 Dharma Yudham (1989)
 Paila Pachiis (1989)
 Vintha Dongalu (1989)
 Ayappa Swami Mahathyam (1989)
 Bhale Donga (1989)
 Jayammu Nischayammu Raa (1989)
 Aggiramudu (1990)
 Dr Bhavani (1990)
 Adadhi (1990)
 Chevilo Puvvu (1990)
 Jayasimha (1990)
 Rambha Rambabu (1990)
 Lorry Driver (1990)
 Tholi Poddu (1991)
 Teneteega (1991)
 Rowdy Gaari Pellam (1991)
 Kshana Kshanam (1991)
 Hello Darling Lechipodama (1992)
 Adharsham (1992)
 Dabbu Bhale Jabbu (1992)
 Rowdy Inspector (1992)
 Money (1993)
 Rendilla Pujari (1993)
 Mayadari Mogudu (1993)
 Konguchatu Krishnadu (1993)
 Pachani Samsaram (1993)
 Varasudu (1993)
 Mechanic Alludu (1993)
 Police Bharya (1994)
 Parugo Parugu (1994)
 Kodalu Didhina Kapuram (1997)
 Jayam Manade Raa (2000)
 Goppinti Alludu (2000)
 Murari (2001)
 Naa Manasistha Raa (2001)
 Nuvvu Naaku Nachav (2001)
 Vyamoham (2002)
 Premasallapam (2002)
 Sontham (2002)
 Nee Sneham (2002)
 Ninne Istapaddanu (2003)
 Simhadri (2003)
 Vasantham (2003)
 Okariki Okaru (2003)
 Tiger Harischandraprasad (2003)
 Dost (2004)
 Anjali I Love U (2004)
 Pallakilo Pellikoothuru (2004)
 Anandamanandamaye (2004)
 Malliswari (2004)
 Bhadradri Ramudu (2004)
 Ammayi Bagundi (2004)
 143 (2004)
 Friendship (2005)
 Alex (2005)
 Naa Alludu (2005)
 Manasu Maata Vinadhu (2005)
 Sravanamasam (2005)
 Andhagadu (2005)
 Andarivadu (2005)
 Oka Oorilo (2005)
 Evandoi Srivaru (2006)
 123 From Amalapuram (2005)
 Soggadu (2005)
 Athadu (2005)
 Nuvvante Naakishtam (2005)
 Bhageeratha (2005)
 Danger (2005)
 Seetharamudu (2006)
 Ramalayam Veedhilo Balu Madhumathi (2006)
 Sri Ramadasu (2006)
 Maayajaalam (2006)
 Nee Navvu Chaalu (2006)
 Roommates (2006)
 Konte Kurrallu (2006)
 Stalin (2006)
 Boss (2006)
 Tata Birla Madhyalo Laila (2006)
 Gopi – Goda Meedha Pilli (2006)
 Pellaina Kothalo (2006)
 Annavaram (2006)
 Athidhi (2007)
 Yamagola Malli Modalayindi (2007)
 Desamuduru (2007)
 Gnapakam (2007)
 Krushi (2008)
 Kantri (2008)
 Deepavali (2008)
 Apada Mokkulavadu  (2008)
 Mr. Medhavi (2008)
 Idhi Sangathi (2008)
 Bhale Dongalu (2008)
 Gamyam (2008)
 Gita  (2008)
 Kalidasu (2008)
 Sawaal (2008)
 Bujjigadu (2008)
 Gorintaku (2008)
 Aalayam (2008)
 Salute (2008)
 Ashta Chemma (2008)
 Rainbow (2008)
 Kousalya Supraja Rama  (2008)
 Blade Babji (2008)
 Andamaina Abaddam  (2008)
 Kuberulu (2008)
 Chedugudu (2008)
 Rs 999 Matrame (2009)
 Konchem Ishtam Konchem Kashtam (2009)
 Aa Aa E Ee: Athanu Aame Inthalo Eeme  (2009)
 Vaade Kavali  (2009)
 Mitrudu (2009)
 Bangaru Babu (2009)
 Ride (2009)
 Magadheera (2009)
 Josh (2009)
 Samardhudu (2009)
 Rechipo (2009)
 Jayeebhava (2009)
 Saleem (2009)
 Maha Muduru (2009)
 Posani Gentleman (2009)
 Yugalageetham (2010)
 Mouna Ragam  (2010)
 Betting Bangaraju (2010)
 Buridi (2010)
 Hasini (2010)
 Rama Rama Krishna Krishna (2010)
 Chalaki (2010)
 Kothi Muka (2010)
 Ramdev (2010)
 Aunty Uncle Nandagopal (2010)
 Adi Nuvve (2010)
 Brindavanam (2010)
 Seeta Ramula Kalyanam (2010)
 Visu  (2010)
 Prathi Roju (2010)
 Golconda High School (2011)
 Veera (2011)
 Rajanna (2011)
 Kandireega (2011)
 Sri Rama Rajyam (2011)
 Veedu Theda (2011)
 Kshetram (2011)
 Rachcha (2012)
 Julayi (2012)
 Dhoni (2012)
 Yamudiki Mogudu (2012)
 Sudigadu (2012)
 Rebel (2012)
 Krishnam Vande Jagadgurum (2012)
 Sevakudu (2013)
 NRI (2013)
 Mirchi (2013)
 1000 Abaddalu (2013) 
 Attarintiki Daredi (2013)
 Doosukeltha (2013)
 Bhai (2013)
 D for Dopidi (2013)
  Jump Jilani (2014)
 Rabhasa (2014) 
 Oohalu Gusagusalade (2014)
 Joru (2014)
 Erra Bus (2014)
 Pilla Nuvvu Leni Jeevitam (2014)
 Ee Varsham Sakshiga (2014) 
 S/O Satyamurthy (2015)
 Vinavayya Ramayya (2015)
James Bond (2015) 
Akhil (2015) 
Kumari 21F (2015)
Dictator (2016)
Shourya (2016)
Eedo Rakam Aado Rakam (2016)
Srimathi Bangaram (2016)
Hyper (2016)
 Abhinetri (2016)
Lakshmi Bomb (2017)
Samanthakamani (2017) 
SriValli (2017)
Inkenti Nuvve Cheppu  (2017)
Raa Raa (2018)
 Ammammagarillu (2018)
Saakshyam (2018)
Silly Fellows (2018)
Vinaya Vidheya Rama (2019)
Guna 369 (2019)
Bombhaat (2020)
30 Rojullo Preminchadam Ela (2021)
Konda Polam (2021)

Tamil
 Eeramana Rojave (1991)
 Azhagiya Tamil Magan (2007)
 Satyam (2008)
 Saagasam (2016)
 Devi (2016)

Hindi 
 Tutak Tutak Tutiya (2016)

Television

Politics
In 2014, Hema participated as MLA in 2014 Andhra Pradesh Legislative Assembly election and lost the from Mandapeta constituency for Jai Samaikyandhra Party.

As MLA

References

External links
 

Living people
Telugu comedians
Telugu actresses
Actresses in Telugu cinema
Indian film actresses
20th-century Indian actresses
People from East Godavari district
21st-century Indian actresses
Actresses from Andhra Pradesh
Indian women comedians
1967 births
Bigg Boss (Telugu TV series) contestants
Santosham Film Awards winners
Nandi Award winners